Mach (Czech and Slovak feminine: Machová) is a surname. Notable people with the surname include:

 Alexander Mach (1902–1980), Slovak politician
 Angelika Mach (born 1991), Polish long-distance runner
 Brice Mach (born 1986), French rugby union player
 Daniel Mach (born 1955), French politician
 David Mach (born 1956), Scottish artist
 Edmund von Mach (1870–1927), German-American writer and lecturer on art
 Ernst Mach (1838–1916), Czech-Austrian physicist and philosopher
 Gerard Mach (1926–2015), Polish sprinter
 Hana Machová (born 1979), Czech basketball player
 Jaroslav Mach (1887–unknown), Czech sport shooter
 Josef Mach (1909–1987), Czech actor, screenwriter and film director
 Ludwig Mach (1868–1951), Czech-Austrian physician
 Marek Mach (activist) (born 2001), Slovak activist
 Marek Mach (footballer) (born 2000), Czech footballer
 Mateusz Mach (born 1997), Polish entrepreneur
 Milan Mach (born 1972), Czech sport shooter
 Pavel Mach (1886–unknown), Czech sport shooter
 Petr Mach (born 1975), Czech politician
 Petr Mach (footballer) (born 1985), Czech footballer
 Radek Mach (born 1984), Czech volleyball player
 Růžena Šlemrová (née Machová, 1886–1962), Czech actress
 Stefanie Mach, American politician
 Veronika Machová (born 1990), Czech beauty pageant contestant
 Wilhelm Mach (1916–1965), Polish writer and literary critic

See also
 
 
 Mai (Chinese surname) > 麦

Czech-language surnames
Polish-language surnames